Adam Film World (AFW) and Adam Film World Guide (AFWG) were American magazines about pornographic film, starting in 1966 as The Adam Film Quarterly.

History
Knight Publishing Corp. had launched Adam magazine in 1956 as an attempt to follow Playboy's success. Adam Film Quarterly was spun off from that magazine by William Rotsler in 1966 to cover the sexploitation film industry. The first issue's cover price was US$1 and the cover story was about The Notorious Daughter of Fanny Hill,  an erotic movie directed by Peter Stootsberry and produced by Bradford Hallworth.

Originally, like Playboy, the publication also covered mainstream films and included feature stories on stars such as Orson Welles or Judy Garland. However, by 1969 it was renamed Adam Film World and issued monthly.

The Internet Adult Film Database owes its start to Peter Van Aarle, who began keeping notes on index cards on adult movies he had seen or were reviewed in Adam Film World starting in 1982.

Adam Film World was called "one of the industry's leading trade publications" in 1994 by the Associated Press.

In his 2001 book Pornography and Sexual Representation, Joseph Slade states, "Extremely valuable are the reports, reviews and gossip of Adam Film World and Adult Video Guide, the oldest American monthly devoted to explicit cinema and generally more reliable than similar magazines, though the information on actors and actresses should be approached with caution. Best described as a fan magazine, Adam Film World hypes the careers of performers for a credulous audience, but partly for that reason it is unparalleled as a guide to the mores and customs of the porn subculture."
Slade pointed out that the magazine's interviews with performers were, to an extent, similar to celebrity interviews in popular mainstream magazines: "Actors and actresses usually begin by talking about their parents, their adolescence, their own children, lovers, the importance of grooming, then move on to discussions of augmented breasts, relative penis sizes, favorite costars and directors, referred techniques of oral, vaginal, or anal sex, striptease dancing on tour as a sideline and—most important—their fan clubs or their 900-telephone numbers."

The publication is also notable for having issued the first movie awards for excellence in pornographic film, first with the X-Caliber Awards in 1975, then replacing them with the AFWG awards starting in 1981 when its sister publication, Adam Film World Guide, was launched. Today the role of adult film awards has been mostly supplanted by Adult Video News, with its AVN Awards, which launched a decade later.

Adam Film World Guide, in turn, spawned an annual Directory of Adult Films starting in 1984. The annuals were "important directories of...hard-core films and videos of the previous eighteen months, with lists of notable films of the past, capsule reviews that rate eroticism from 'warm' to 'volcanic,' addresses of distributors and retail outlets, brief biographies of actors, directors, and producers and indexes by theme, director, and performer."

Edward S. Sullivan was the first editor of Adam Film World, followed briefly in 1984 by John Zeus, while former pornographic film actor Tim Connelly was editor, under the name Jeremy Stone, from 1985 to 2003. Connelly, as Stone, was inducted into the X-Rated Critics Organization Hall of Fame in the Fifth Estate category in 1998.

Knight Publishing eventually expanded to add several other magazine titles such as Adam Black Video Illustrated, Adam Gay Video, and Cinema X Monthly and several others, but Adam Film World remained the flagship of the group until it was discontinued in the late 1990s in favour of Adam Film World Guide. By 2008, owner Bentley Morriss put the company up for sale. When a buyer was not found, the magazine empire folded.

X-Caliber Awards
The Adam Film World annual X-Caliber Awards based their selection of winners "largely on the votes of readers who are members of the audiences of the adult theaters." although after the popular vote is counted, "an editorial panel makes the final selections". The winners were announced annually starting with the August 1976 issue for films released the previous year. By the second year, the Z-Caliber Awards, for the worst movies, were also introduced.

Z-Caliber Awards

Adam Film World Guide Awards

In 1981, Adam Film World revived its awards with a new name, the Adam Film World Guide Awards, to coincide with the launch of a sister magazine, Adam Film World Guide. Rather than giving single awards in several categories, AFWG had only a few categories — top films, top videos, top sex scenes, best male and female performers and best director — but named the top five or top 10 of each. Then, until 2003, in the annual AFWG Directory of Adult Films it ranked the top three movies of the year, a combination of movies shot on film and those shot on videotape:

Starting with the 2002 awards, Adam Film World Guide changed the focus of the annual awards. Rather than naming the top 10 films and top 10 videos (which the Directory then condensed into a list of the year's top three movies), AFWG just named one top film, one top video and 51 other awards to movies and individuals for a wide range of categories such as Best Asian Starlet, Best Fetish Vignette Movie, Best Couples Movie, Best Gonzo Comedy, Best Music, Best Box Cover Art and Best All-Girl Orgy Series.

With movies shot on film and videotape giving way to digital, the Best Films and Best Videos categories were eventually combined into Best Movie, and so in 2005, Adam Film World Guide Directory stopped naming the previous year's top three movies, thereafter just reprinting the entire list of AFWG individual awards. The final awards, for movies released in 2007, were published in the July 2008 issue of Adam Film World Guide.

2002–08

Adam Black Video Top 25
Adam Black Video Directory was an annual publication produced from 1998 to 2007, which grew out of Adam Black Video Illustrated.

In the late 1990s Adam Black Video Directory decided the time had come to honor a list of the best black and interracial movies of all time, because there had been few awards given for them in the past. Adding a few new ones each year, by 2000 the list had grown to a top 25, with a tie for 6th place (shown with year of release in brackets): 1. Black Throat (1985), 2. Maverdick (1995), 3. Let Me Tell Ya 'bout White Chicks (1984), 4. Nasty Video Magazine 5 (1999), 5. Friend to the Black Man (1998), 6. Harlem Candy (1987), 6. N.B.A. (Nuttin' But Ass) (1996), 7. The Look 2000 (1997), 8. The Legend of Reggie D (1989), 9. The Adventures of Dick Black the Black Dick (1987), 10. Pussyman 7 (1994), 11. Starbangers 2 (1994), 12. Escape to Pleasure Island (1998), 13. My Black Ass (1997), 14. Booty Bitch (1995), 15. African Angels (1996), 16. Hot Rod Honeyz, 17. Black Butt Jungle (1998), 18. Kink World (1993), 19. Mac' In 2 (1996), 20. Centerfold (1997), 21. Dear John (1993), 22. Buttman Back in Rio 4, 23. The Dream Team (1996), 24. Isis Blublue filme (1998) and 25. Bomb Ass Pussy (1998).

Adam Gay Video "Dave" Awards
Originated in 1989 by Adam Gay Video Directory editor Dave Kinnick, The "Dave" Awards were originally announced in Kinnick's monthly "Video Review" column in Advocate Men Magazine. They moved to Adam Gay Video 1996 Directory after the column ceased in December 1994.

Notes

Some of the terminology used by Adam Film World for some of the awards was deleted or replaced by something less vulgar in these instances.

In announcing the Z-Caliber Awards in 1977, Adam Film World did not give Worst Direction or Worst Sinematography Awards, saying "We had a couple more Z-Calibers in mind but have deleted them just to be nice—also the contenders were running neck-and-neck." In announcing the 1978 awards, the previous year's awards were also noted and this time a Worst Sinematography Award for 1977 was named, but the Worst Direction for that year was "withheld by request".

The 2002 Adam Film World Guide Directory listed Marissa as first runner-up and Beast as second runner-up, however, this was changed to Euphoria and Taboo 2001 in subsequent directories. It is likely Marissa and Beast were the incorrect entries because Euphoria was named best video that year and since all four movies were shot-on-video productions, it would be the most likely to make the top three movies list overall.

References
 Adam Film World Guide Directory annuals, 1990 to 2005

External links
 
 "Adam Film World Guide Announces Awards Winners" - 2006
 "Adam Film World Announces Annual (2007) Award Winners"
 "Adam Film World Names Annual Awards Winners" - 2008

Adult industry awards
Film magazines published in the United States
Men's magazines published in the United States
Monthly magazines published in the United States
Pornographic magazines published in the United States
American pornographic film awards
Quarterly magazines published in the United States
Defunct magazines published in the United States
Magazines established in 1966
Magazines disestablished in 1998